The Innovation and Technology party (Norwegian: Innovasjon- og teknologipartiet, ITP), former The Pirate Party is a Norwegian political party which was founded in 2012. Its basic principles are "full transparency in state management, privacy on the internet, as well as better use of IT and technology to make a better democracy". On 17 December 2012 they announced that they had collected the 5,000 signatures required by law to register a political party and take part in the next general election. The party is a part of the Pirate Parties International.

History

Founding 

In June 2012 the party issued invitations to a kickoff meeting to be held in Trondheim on the 16th, with the intention of agreeing on a strategy to obtain the 5,000 signatures required by law to register a political party. By 16 December they had received sufficient signatures and were legally recognised.

Name 
The party congress decided 11 March 2023, to change the party`s name to Innovasjon- og teknologipartiet (The Innovation and Technology party).

Party Leaders 
 Svein Mork Dahl (2019 - )
 Thomas Gramstad (2017 - 2019)
 Tale Haukbjørk Østrådal (2015 - 2017)
 Øystein Bruås Jakobsen  (2013 - 2015)
 Geir Aaslid (2012 - 2013)

Parliamentary Election results

References 

Political parties in Norway
Norway
Political parties established in 2012
2012 establishments in Norway